The Beachcomber was an ITC Entertainment adventure TV series which ran for one series of 39 half-hour episodes in 1962.

Plot
Narrated by Cameron Mitchell, the series followed a rich executive who retired from the rat race to become a beachcomber on a small South Pacific island.

Main cast
Cameron Mitchell as John Lackland
Don Megowan as Captain Huckabee
Sebastian Cabot as Commissioner Andrew Crippen
Bill Hess as Alfy
George Mitchell as the Reverend Snow
Joan Staley as Linda
Jerry Summers as Tarmu

Guest stars in the series included Adam West, Frank Silvera and Cesar Romero

Episode list
The Brooch 
The Shark Affair 
Pat Hand 
The Hijackers 
Forbidden Island 
The Chase 
Captain Huckabee's Beard 
The Taming of Andrew 
Death Do Us Part 
The Larcenous Lover 
Girl in Hiding 
Honor Bound 
Tambu 
The Black Pearl 
Charlie Six Kids 
Empty Village 
The Floating Fortune 
Honest Larceny 
Neilani 
Mr. Winters 
Rongorongo Man 
The Day of the Whale 
The Fugitive 
The Mask of Talugi 
Home to Roost 
Devil in Paradise 
The Reward 
Tribal Law 
Flight to Freedom 
Long Live the Sultan 
The Prodigal Pretender 
The Spaniard 
Man with a Guitar 
The Ransom 
The Search for Robert Herrick 
The Two-Sided Triangle 
A Rooster Named Red 
Roll of Thunder 
Paradise Lost

External links

 
 TV.com listing

1962 American television series debuts
1962 American television series endings
American adventure television series
Black-and-white American television shows
First-run syndicated television programs in the United States
Television series by ITC Entertainment
Television series set on fictional islands
Television shows set in Oceania